Sébastien Van Aerschot (born 2 April 1986) is a Belgian football player who plays as a central defender for RFC Tilleur SG.

Career
He has formerly played for UR Namur and Charleroi in the Belgian First Division.

References

External links
 
 

1986 births
Belgian footballers
Association football defenders
Living people
R. Charleroi S.C. players
Union Royale Namur Fosses-La-Ville players
Belgian Pro League players
Challenger Pro League players
Sportspeople from Namur (city)
Footballers from Namur (province)